World Rally Championship is a rally racing video game series. To date, three series of video games with the official license have been released.

History
The first series were published by Sony Computer Entertainment who owned the WRC license in the early 2000s. These titles were all made by British developer Evolution Studios between 2001 and 2005. The series consists of five original games released exclusively for the Sony PlayStation 2 console, and one port for the Sony handheld PSP, all based on the World Rally Championship seasons from 2001 to 2005, using official drivers, cars and locations.

The license then remained dormant until 2009 when Italian publisher Black Bean Games signed a four-year licensing contract. The second series then followed, which included five games published by Black Bean Games and developed by Italian developer Milestone between 2010 and 2013. These included four official WRC games based on seasons from 2010 to 2013, as well as a licensed arcade title, all of them released for Microsoft Windows, PlayStation 3 and Xbox 360.

In July 2013 the license was picked up by the French publisher Bigben Interactive. Bigben hired Paris-based developer Kylotonn to work on the third series of games, which started in 2015 with WRC 5 and continued with WRC 6 in 2016, WRC 7 in 2017 and WRC 8 in 2019, based on the 2015, 2016, 2017 and 2019 World Rally Championship seasons. All four were released for Microsoft Windows, PlayStation 4 and Xbox One. A port of WRC was released for Android titled WRC the Official Game on Play Store on 4 December 2014.

WRC Promoter GmbH extended its licensing agreement with game developer Kylotonn until 2022, with WRC 9, WRC 10 and WRC Generations all confirmed to be released on the new-generation Xbox Series X and PlayStation 5 platforms.

Codemasters acquired the exclusive license for WRC games in 2020, to start for games in 2023 and for five years after, with its planned first game to be released in 2024. EA Sports would be in charged for a partnership with the company after Electronic Arts being acquired in 2021.

Games

Main titles

Spin-offs

Release history

World Rally Championship (2001)

World Rally Championship was released for PlayStation 2 on 30 November 2001 in Europe and 21 March 2002 in North America. The game features FIA licensed cars, stages and drivers from the 2001 season and has a career mode allowing the player to work through the World Rally Championship season. The game also features damage simulation in the form of visual damage as well as performance damage if the player crashes.

WRC II Extreme (2002)

WRC II Extreme is the sequel to WRC World Rally Championship and was released for PlayStation 2 in Europe and Japan on 27 November 2002. It contains teams, drivers, cars and rallies from the 2002 WRC season. It also includes "extreme" cars designed by the teams. The main soundtrack to WRC II Extreme was produced by the Chemical Brothers. Additionally, the tracks "Come with Us/The Test" and "Star Guitar" from the Chemical Brothers album, Come with Us (2002) were also used in the game.

WRC 3 (2003)

WRC 3 is the second sequel to WRC World Rally Championship and was released for PlayStation 2 on 21 November 2003 in Europe, and 27 May 2004 in Japan. It contains teams, drivers, cars and rallies from the 2003 WRC season. It also contains Extreme and Concept cars, designed by the teams.

WRC 4 (2004)

WRC 4 is the fourth installment of the WRC World Rally Championship series and was released on 22 October 2004 in Europe and 7 April 2005 in Japan. It contains teams, drivers, cars and rallies from the 2004 WRC season. It also contains Extreme cars designed by the teams, S1600 cars and Group N4 cars.

WRC: Rally Evolved (2005)

WRC: Rally Evolved or WRC5 is the last of the series for the PS2. It was released exclusively in Europe on 28 October 2005. The game includes teams, drivers, cars and rallies from the 2005 WRC season. It also contains Extreme and Concept cars designed by the teams, S1600 cars and Group B cars from the 1980s.

World Rally Championship (2005)

In 2005, British game studio Traveller's Tales and SCEE developed a new WRC title for the PlayStation Portable based on WRC: Rally Evolved, which had recently been released on the PS2. The PSP port was jointly released by Sony Computer Entertainment (EU/JP) and Namco Bandai Games (NA) on 18 November 2005 in Europe, 9 March 2006 in Japan, and 18 April in North America. It is known as WRC, WRC: FIA World Rally Championship and World Rally Championship in the UK, Japan and the US, respectively.

Like its predecessor, World Rally Championship is based around the 2005 season and features 30 fully deformable 2005 WRC, Evolution and Extreme spec cars. In championship mode, players have the opportunity to play through the entire WRC season as any one of the 17 official 2004 registered drivers from the six official manufacturers, participating in 16 official rallies spanning five continents and 16 countries. Additionally, there are 19 bonus stages and downloadable content that was available to users. In addition to championship mode, there are also quick rally, time trial and single rally single-player game modes. World Rally Championship also supports various ad hoc multiplayer modes, such as wireless time trial, turn-based time trial, turn-based single rally, and turn-based championship.

However, unlike the PS2 version, the PSP remake does not include damage simulation, though visual damage to the vehicle can be seen.

WRC FIA World Rally Championship (2010)

WRC FIA World Rally Championship was released on 8 October 2010 in Europe and 14 April 2011 in Japan. It was the first game to be officially licensed by the WRC since 2005's WRC: Rally Evolved, and is also the first official WRC game to be released on Xbox and PC. It features the official cars, drivers and co-drivers from the 2010 season and from the three support classes: Production World Rally Championship, Super 2000 World Rally Championship and Junior World Rally Championship.

A downloadable car pack, featuring Group B rally cars from the 1980s, was released on the day of the game's release.

WRC 2: FIA World Rally Championship (2011)

WRC 2: FIA World Rally Championship was released on the PlayStation 3, Xbox 360 and PC on 14 October 2011 in Europe and 16 February 2012 in Japan. It is the second installment in Milestone's rebooted WRC series and is the official video game of the 2011 FIA World Rally Championship, featuring cars and rallies from the 2011 season, including support categories.

WRC 3: FIA World Rally Championship (2012)

WRC 3: FIA World Rally Championship was released on the PlayStation 3, PlayStation Vita, Xbox 360 and PC on 12 October 2012 in Europe. It is the third installment in Milestone's rebooted WRC series and is the official video game of the 2012 FIA World Rally Championship, featuring cars and rallies from the 2012 season, including support categories.

WRC Powerslide (2013)
WRC Powerslide was developed by Milestone srl and released on the PlayStation Network, Xbox Live Arcade and Steam.

As of April 2016, the game has been taken down off from the PSN, XLA, and Steam stores.

WRC 4: FIA World Rally Championship (2013)

WRC 4: FIA World Rally Championship was released on the PlayStation 3, Xbox 360 and PC and PlayStation Vita in October 2013 in Europe. It is the fourth installment in Milestone's rebooted WRC series and is the official video game of the 2013 FIA World Rally Championship, featuring cars and rallies from the 2013 season, including support categories.

WRC 5 (2015)

WRC 5 was released on PlayStation 4, PlayStation 3, PlayStation Vita, Xbox 360, PC and Xbox One in October 2015. It is the first installment on next generation consoles and was developed by Paris-based Kylotonn and published by Bigben Interactive. WRC 5 is the official video game of the 2015 FIA World Rally Championship, featuring cars and rallies from the 2015 season, including support categories, and a total of 400 km of stages. It is the first WRC game for eighth generation consoles. This game featured British indie rock band Bastille's song "Pompeii" in its intro. The game reached number 10 in the UK physical sales chart, and number 10 in the downloads chart.

WRC 6 (2016)

WRC 6 was released on PlayStation 4, Xbox One and PC on 7 October 2016. It was developed by Paris-based Kylotonn and published by Bigben Interactive. WRC 6 is the official video game of the 2016 FIA World Rally Championship, featuring cars and rallies from the 2016 season. The Toyota Yaris WRC test car was made available as a pre-order DLC.

WRC 7 (2017)

WRC 7 was released on PlayStation 4, Xbox One and PC on 26 September 2017. It was developed by Paris-based Kylotonn and published by Bigben Interactive. WRC 7 is the official video game of the 2017 World Rally Championship season, featuring cars and rallies from the 2017 season.

WRC 8 (2019)

WRC 8 was released on PlayStation 4, Nintendo Switch, Xbox One and PC on 10 September 2019. It was developed by Paris-based Kylotonn and published by Bigben Interactive. WRC 8 is the official video game of the 2019 World Rally Championship season, featuring cars and rallies from the 2019 season.

WRC 9 (2020)

WRC 9 was released on PlayStation 4, Xbox One and PC on 3 September 2020. PlayStation 5 and Xbox Series X and Series S were launched on 12 November 2020, with the Nintendo Switch version available on 11 March 2021. It was developed by Paris-based Kylotonn and published by Bigben Interactive. WRC 9 is the official video game of the 2020 World Rally Championship season, featuring cars and rallies from the 2020 season.

WRC 10 (2021)

WRC 10 was released on PlayStation 4, PlayStation 5, Xbox One, Xbox Series X and Series S and PC on 2 September 2021. It was developed by Paris-based Kylotonn and published by Nacon. WRC 10 is the official video game of the 2021 World Rally Championship season, featuring cars and rallies from the 2021 season.

WRC Generations (2022)

WRC Generations was released on PlayStation 4, PlayStation 5, Xbox One, Xbox Series X and Series S and PC on 3 November 2022. It was developed by Paris-based Kylotonn and published by Nacon. WRC Generations is the official video game of the 2022 World Rally Championship season, featuring cars and rallies from the 2022 season.

See also
 List of World Rally Championship video games

References

External links
 WRC World Rally Championship games official website
 WRC World Rally Championship at MobyGames

Nacon franchises

Sony Interactive Entertainment franchises
Video games developed in France
Video games developed in Italy
Video games developed in the United Kingdom
Video game franchises introduced in 2001